KUDA (88.7 FM) was a radio station broadcasting a variety format. Licensed to Shoshoni, Wyoming, United States, the station was owned by KUDA, Inc. KUDA broadcast from a mountain north of Shoshoni, and served the greater Fremont County/Hot Springs County region. It also broadcast on a translator, K244EU (96.7 FM) located in Thermopolis, Wyoming. The station's RDS stated it was "Wyoming's Hot Spot".

KUDA Inc. surrendered the station's license to the Federal Communications Commission on May 5, 2021. The FCC cancelled KUDA's license on June 2, 2021. Due to that, K244EU started simulcasting KDLY

References

External links

UDA
Radio stations established in 2013
2013 establishments in Wyoming
Defunct radio stations in the United States
Radio stations disestablished in 2021
2021 disestablishments in Wyoming
UDA
Fremont County, Wyoming
Variety radio stations in the United States